Gol & (Dan) Gincu (Goalpost and Lipsticks) was a 2006 Malaysian TV series spun off from the 2005 film of the same title produced by Red Films and directed by Bernard Chauly, continuing upon the affairs of the all-female futsal team "Bukan Team Biasa" (Malay: "Not an Ordinary Team"). Its first season was first aired from 4 June till 27 August 2006 on 8TV and while its second and final season ran from 8 July to 30 September 2007. The first season of the series was also aired in Singapore on Suria from 26 December 2006 till 20 March 2007.

Plot
Apart from their passion toward futsal, Putri and Reza make a lovely dating couple albeit their different background. Putri is a fashion student at Limkokwing who hails from an affluent family while Reza is a law student from Universiti Malaya who has to work part-time in the futsal court frequented by Putri's gang, to sustain himself and his education.

Ayu has been in a long crush on Reza since their first days as coursemates. Reza actually does not notice Ayu's feelings toward him, and when Ayu decides that the time has come to let it out on Reza, Putri appears to ruin her plans. Yet Ayu does not give up easily, plotting to break up Putri and Reza, while ensuring at the same time that she maintains friendship with her rival.

Reza begins to feel that perhaps he has been going out with a less-than-compatible romance partner, while dealing with his own personal inner demons from being HIV positive due to his past drug addiction. At the same time, Putri begins to face new problems beginning with her other best friend Mia deciding to drop out and marry a much older man against her parents' wishes, followed by her futsal teammates' preoccupation in their own personal problems, causing them to attend futsal training less frequently while her mother Datin Aina is depressed over the resurfacing of a mysterious man she knew from her past which is eventually revealed to be Putri's estranged real father.

But, unexpectedly Putri finds herself teaming up with her old rival Shasha and her teammates  Zie, Sarah, J, Dayang and Ling. This is where Putri realises that when a bunch of girls unite, they can outdo just anything in their lives.

Episode summaries

Season 1

Season 2

Cast list
 Nur Fazura Sharifuddin – Putri
 Pierre Andre – Reza
 Sazzy Falak – Shasha
 Ashraf Sinclair – Eddy
 Melissa Maureen – Mia
 Razif Hashim - Haikal
 Mazlina Hassan – Ayu
 Rafidah Abdullah – Zie
 Zarina Zainoodin – Dayang
 Kartini Kamalul Arifin – Sarah
 Celina Khor – Ling
 Fasha Rahman – “J”

Fahmi Fadzil, the current Malaysia's minister for digital communication, played a minor role in Gol & Gincu too.

References

External links
Official Gol & Gincu site at 8TV — contains videos of full episodes and snippets
 Gol & Gincu page on Red Communications' website — contains video of the opening theme of the series
 Lipsticksandgoalpost.blogspot.com — Behind the scenes of the series in the eyes of crewmember Daniel Henry

Malaysian drama television series
2006 Malaysian television series debuts
2007 Malaysian television series endings